The 2007 James Madison Dukes football team represented James Madison University in the 2007 NCAA Division I FCS football season. They were led by head coach Mickey Matthews and played their home games at Bridgeforth Stadium in Harrisonburg, Virginia. JMU finished the season 8–4 with a record of 6–2 in their first season as members of the Colonial Athletic Association.

Schedule

References

James Madison
James Madison Dukes football seasons
James Madison Dukes football